Sanat Sari Football Club is an Iranian football club based in Sari, Iran. They currently compete in the 2nd Division.

History
The club was formed out of the ensuring battle to relocate Mehrkam Pars Tehran after the club ran into financial difficulties. After initial reports that the club had been bought by the city of Urmia, the club mysteriously moved to
Sari a few days later.

Season by season
The table below chronicles the achievements of the Club in various competitions.

First Team Squad
As of March 4, 2012

References

External links
Fan site
Fan site

Football clubs in Iran
Sport in Mazandaran Province
2010 establishments in Iran